Rasor and Clardy Company Building is a historic commercial building located at Mullins, Marion County, South Carolina. It was originally a jail prior to 1914 when it was converted into a mercantile called the Rasor and Clardy Company, and is a two-story, brick commercial building.  The building features metalwork, stained glass and glass tile, mosaic tiles at the entranceways, wooden coffered ceilings in the display windows, and pressed metal interior cornices and ceilings.  It is considered the most intact early-20th century commercial building remaining in Mullins.

It was listed in the National Register of Historic Places in 1982.

References

Commercial buildings on the National Register of Historic Places in South Carolina
Commercial buildings completed in 1914
Buildings and structures in Marion County, South Carolina
National Register of Historic Places in Marion County, South Carolina